Phitti is a type of leavened bread baked by Hunzakut People of Hunza, Gilgit-Baltistan, Pakistan.

Preparation involves mixing flour, water, salt, butter and yeast, with other ingredients such as milk being added depending on personal taste. The dough thus prepared is placed in a metallic vessel called a Khimishdon in Burushaski and placed in a hearth which is preheated with a wooden fire. Alternatively, phitti can also be baked in an oven.

Eaten with butter during breakfast, as a snack or light lunch along with a salted cup of tea.

References 

Flatbreads
Pakistani breads